Pallaskenry Agricultural College is a centre of training for farmers, mechanics and salespeople for the agricultural and farm machinery industries. It is located in Pallaskenry, County Limerick, Ireland, and is owned and managed by the Salesian Fathers. The college is co-located with Salesian Secondary College.  The Salesians also used to run Warrenstown College, County Meath.

The college runs courses in partnership with Limerick Institute of Technology (LIT), Teagasc, FETAC, HETAC, City & Guilds, Fás and Limerick VEC. Courses include an Advanced Certificate in Agriculture and an Advanced Certificate in Agricultural Mechanisation validated by FETAC, as well as a Higher Certificate in Technology in Agricultural Mechanisation validated by HETAC with LIT. Also running is a new Teagasc Level 6 Advanced Certificate in Agriculture.

Facilities
The college farm consists of 210 hectares and a dairy herd. A milking parlour and dairy shed are located onsite. The farm has a beef cattle herd and a flock of sheep. There are engineering and machinery workshops to facilitate the delivery of the colleges specialised machinery programmes. The college also houses computer labs for student training.

References

External links
Pallaskenry Agricultural College website

Education in County Limerick
Educational institutions established in 1922
1922 establishments in Ireland
Further education colleges in the Republic of Ireland
Agricultural universities and colleges in Ireland